An All-American team is an honorary sports team composed of the best amateur players of a specific season for each team position—who in turn are given the honorific "All-America" and typically referred to as "All-American athletes", or simply "All-Americans". Although the honorees generally do not compete together as a unit, the term is used in U.S. team sports to refer to players who are selected by members of the national media. Walter Camp selected the first All-America team in the early days of American football in 1889. The 2021 NCAA Women's Basketball All-Americans are honorary lists that include All-American selections from the Associated Press (AP), the United States Basketball Writers Association (USBWA), and the Women's Basketball Coaches Association (WBCA) for the 2020–21 NCAA Division I women's basketball season. Both AP and USBWA choose three teams, while WBCA lists 10 honorees.

A consensus All-America team in women's basketball has never been organized. This differs from the practice in men's basketball, in which the NCAA uses a combination of selections by AP, USBWA, the National Association of Basketball Coaches (NABC), and Sporting News to determine a consensus All-America team. The selection of a consensus All-America men's basketball team is possible because all four organizations select at least a first and second team, with only the USBWA not selecting a third team.

Before the 2017–18 season, it was impossible for a consensus women's All-America team to be determined because the AP had been the only body that divided its women's selections into separate teams. The USBWA first named separate teams in 2017–18. The women's counterpart to the NABC, the Women's Basketball Coaches Association (WBCA), continues the USBWA's former practice of selecting a single 10-member (plus ties) team. Sporting News does not select an All-America team in women's basketball.

By selector

Associated Press (AP)  
Announced on March 17, 2021.

AP Honorable Mention

United States Basketball Writers Association (USBWA) 
Announced on April 2, 2021.

Women's Basketball Coaches Association (WBCA) 
Announced on April 3, 2021.

By player

Academic All-Americans
The College Sports Information Directors of America (CoSIDA) announced its 15-member 2021 Academic All-America team on May 28, 2021, divided into first, second and third teams, with Aliyah Boston of South Carolina chosen as women's college basketball Academic All-American of the Year, also becoming the first sophomore so honored in D-I women's basketball.

Senior All-Americans
The 10 finalists for the Senior CLASS Award, called Senior All-Americans, were announced on February 22, 2021. Rennia Davis of Tennessee was named the recipient on April 2, with the first and second teams also being announced at that time.

First team

Second team

References

All-Americans
NCAA Women's Basketball All-Americans